The Journal of Purchasing and Supply Management is a quarterly peer-reviewed academic journal published by Elsevier. It covers research in the field of purchasing and supply management. The journal also publishes a yearly special issue containing selected papers from the annual meeting of the International Purchasing & Supply Education & Research Association. It was established in 1994 as the European Journal of Purchasing & Supply Management. The editors-in-chief are Louise Knight and Wendy Tate. Previous editors are Alessandro Ancarani and George A. Zsidisin, Finn Wynstra, Christine Harland, and the founding editor, Richard Lamming.

Abstracting and indexing 
The Journal of Purchasing and Supply Management is abstracted and indexed by Scopus and the Social Sciences Citation Index.

References

External links 
 

Business and management journals
Publications established in 1994
Elsevier academic journals
English-language journals
Quarterly journals